Valery Lagunov is a Russian choreographer.

Biography
Lagunov was born on June 2, 1942 in Moscow, Russia. In 1962 he graduated from the Moscow State Choreographic Academy where his teacher was Aleksey Yermolayev, and same year joined Bolshoi Ballet. He first appeared in Scriabiniana as Garland in 1962 and four next year played in The Sleeping Beauty as Prince. In 1966 he played as one of the shepherd boys in the Nutcracker and five years later appeared as Archon in Icarus. In 1972 he participated in the Swan Lake where he played a role of Evil genius and the same year played a role as a dance teacher in Cinderella. Three years later he appeared as Albrecht in Giselle and by 1976 played a role of black man in Mozart and Salieri. The same year he was named Merited Artist of the Russian Federation and also appeared as Don Juan in Love for Love. In 1979 he graduated from the Russian University of Theatre Arts and retired as a dancer in 1983. Since 1996 he teaches such future ballet dancers as Mikhail Lobukhin and Vladislav Lantratov.

References

1942 births
Dancers from Moscow
Living people
Russian male ballet dancers
20th-century Russian ballet dancers
Bolshoi Ballet principal dancers
Ballet masters